Ruth Draper (December 2, 1884December 30, 1956) was an American actress, dramatist and noted diseuse who specialized in character-driven monologues and monodrama. Her best-known pieces include The Italian Lesson, Three Women and Mr. Clifford, Doctors and Diets, and A Church in Italy.

Early life and family 

Ruth Draper was born in New York City, the youngest child of Dr. William Henry and Ruth (née Dana) Draper. Her father, who was born in Brattleboro, Vermont, had the affluence to support a large family with the help of several servants. Ruth Draper's mother was the daughter of Charles Anderson Dana, editor and publisher of The New York Sun and had married Dr. Draper in 1878 some years after the loss of his first wife, Lucy. Her nephew, Paul Draper, was a noted dancer and actor. Draper's second cousin was the society architect Paul Phipps, father of the British performer Joyce Grenfell. Her nephew Raimund Sanders Draper was a WWII pilot.

Career 

Ruth Draper's inspiration to become an actress came from the Polish pianist Ignacy Jan Paderewski, a friend of her family. She made her Broadway debut in the 1916 play A Lady's Name by Cyril Harcourt, and by 1921 was becoming well known as monologist, or more specifically diseuse, appearing in monodramas.

Draper dominated the field of professional solo performance during the second quarter of the twentieth century, performing with great success throughout the United States and Europe. Draper's one-person shows differed in kind from the majority of the early lyceum and Chautauqua solo performers coming before her, because her monologues/monodramas portrayed original characters as opposed to selections taken from published literature.

With a chair, shawl, and occasional table as her only props, Draper entertained audiences in a half dozen languages worldwide for nearly forty years. Her best-known pieces include The Italian Lesson, Three Women and Mr. Clifford, Doctors and Diets, and A Church in Italy.

Such theatre luminaries as Bernard Shaw, Thornton Wilder, John Gielgud, Katharine Hepburn, Maurice Chevalier, Laurence Olivier, and Uta Hagen were among those impressed by Draper's artistry and talent, as were the authors Henry James, Henry Adams, Edith Wharton, and Agatha Christie. Draper inspired characters in two of Christie's works — Carlotta Adams in the 1933 novel Lord Edgware Dies, and Aspasia Glen in the short story "The Dead Harlequin".

In 1951 King George VI of the United Kingdom awarded Ruth Draper honorary membership in the Order of the British Empire with the rank of Commander (CBE). On April 29, 1953, she had lunch with C. S. Lewis the day after he saw her performance at the New Theatre in Oxford. Nearly a quarter century earlier she gave a performance at Windsor Castle after an invitation from King George V and Queen Mary.

Draper had many relationships in Italy, in large part through her connection with Lauro De Bosis, a young Italian poet and writer who died in 1931 after a daring flight over Rome during which he threw thousands of leaflets denouncing Benito Mussolini and the National Fascist Party.

Death 

Ruth Draper died on December 30, 1956, of an apparent heart attack, just hours after giving a performance on Broadway at the Playhouse Theatre. Draper's family had a summer home in Islesboro, Maine, which she purchased from her family and where she spent increasing amounts of time in her later years. A short biography of Draper is among several collected by the Anglo-Italian writer Iris Origo in her 1984 book, A Need to Testify.

Recordings 
Recordings of Draper's monologues have influenced many contemporary writers and performers, including Joyce Grenfell, Lily Tomlin, Mike Nichols, Julie Harris, Simon Callow, Emma Thompson, Charles Busch, David Mamet, Julia Sweeney, Annette Bening, Maureen Lipman and John Lithgow.

Awards and honors 
In 2019, the "Complete Recorded Monologues, Ruth Draper (1954–1956)" was selected by the Library of Congress for preservation in the National Recording Registry for being "culturally, historically, or aesthetically significant".

References

Further reading 
Young, Jordan R. (1989). Acting Solo: The Art of One-Person Shows. Beverly Hills: Past Times Publishing Co.
Catron, Louis E.  (2000). The Power of One: The Solo Play for Playwrights, Actors, and Directors.  Portsmouth, N.H: Heinemann.
Origo, Iris (1984). A Need to Testify: Portraits of Lauro de Bosis, Ruth Draper, Gaetano Salvemini, Ignazio Silone and an essay on Biography, Harcourt Brace Jovanovich.
Gentile, John S. (1989). Cast of One: One-Person Shows from the Chautauqua Platform to the Broadway Stage. University of Illinois Press.

External links 

Biography from drapermonologues.com
Legacy from drapermonologues.com
Barnett Owen papers regarding Ruth Draper, 1905–1956, held by the Billy Rose Theatre Division, New York Public Library for the Performing Arts

Morton Dauwen Zabel: The Art of Ruth Draper. Her Dramas and Characters. With a Memoir. Doubleday, Garden City 1960, at archive.org
 2 photographs, Encyclopædia Britannica

1884 births
1956 deaths
American stage actresses
Honorary Commanders of the Order of the British Empire
People from Brattleboro, Vermont
Actresses from New York City
Actresses from Vermont
Writers from New York City
Writers from Vermont
20th-century American actresses
20th-century American dramatists and playwrights
People from Islesboro, Maine
Members of the Junior League